The FN Grand Browning was a prototype semi automatic pistol manufactured by FN Herstal of Belgium. The weapon was an M1911 type pistol intended for the European market but chambered in the 9.65x23mm round.

Overview
The FN Grand Browning is a 9.65x23mm calibre semi automatic pistol using a short recoil operation. The weapon is nearly identical to the M1911 but with a few differences, notably the sight blade, pistol grips, magazine capacity/components.

References

 FN Browning Pistols, Side Arms that Shaped World History. Anthony Vanderlinden, 
 FN Grand Browning

See also
Browning Hi-Power
List of pistols

1911 platform
FN Herstal firearms
Semi-automatic pistols of Belgium